Events from the year 1774 in Denmark.

Incumbents
 Monarch – Christian VII
 Prime minister – Ove Høegh-Guldberg

Events
 31 January – The Royal Danish Theatre reopens on Kongens Nytorv in Copenhagen.. 
 26 Seåtember  Vordingborg Cacalry District is divided into 12 manors and sold at auction.
 Iselingen, Rosenfeldt, Snertinge and  Avnø (32,000 rigsdaler) were sold to  Reinhard Iselin.
 Øbjerggaard are sold for 30,050 rigsdaler to Niels Ruberg-.
 Lundbygård is sold for 34,000 rigsdaler  to Casper Wilhelm von Munthe af Morgenstierne.
 Skovbygård is sold for 30,120 rigsdaler tp Hans Pedersen.
 Beldringe (48 000 rigsdaler) and Lekkende ( 40,000 rigsdaler) are sold to Frederik Sophus Raben.
 Kallehavegaard is sold to Peter Johansen. 
 27 November – The Order of the Chain is founded in Copenhagen.

Undated
 The former Antvoeskov Cavalry District was divided into nine estates and sold by public auction.
 Antvorskov
 Valbygård was sold to general Joachim Melchior Holten Castenskiold of Borreby,
 Frederikslund was sold to  Hans Larsen Fogh.
 Pebringegård was sold to Georg Ditlev Frederik Koës
 Gyldenholm (two lots) was sold to Anders Dinesen.
 Tårnborg was sold to Dyrehovedgård.
 The Barony of Holberg is established by Ludvig Holberg from the manors of Brorupgård and Tersløsegaard.

Births
 5 March – Christoph Ernst Friedrich Weyse, composer (died 1842)
 15 March – Salomon Soldin, publisher and writer (died 1837)
 11 June – Christian Conrad, Count of Danneskiold-Samsøe, councillor, board member, landowner and magistrate (died 1823)

Deaths
 13 August – Peter Applebye, industrialist (born 1709)
 24 December – Peter Fenger (born 1719)

References

External links

 
1770s in Denmark
Denmark
Years of the 18th century in Denmark